Imiaslavie (literally "praising the name") or Imiabozhie, also spelled imyaslavie and imyabozhie, and also referred to as onomatodoxy, is a Christian dogmatic movement that asserts that the name of God is God Himself. The movement emerged in the beginning of the 20th century, but both proponents and opponents claim it to be connected with religious thought throughout the history of Christianity. Advocates in particular claim its connections to the Church Fathers, while opponents claim the connections to the ancient heresiarchs.

Beginning

The 20th century history of imiaslavie started in 1907 with the publication of the book On the Caucasus Mountains by a revered starets, schema-monk Hilarion. In his book, Hilarion told of his spiritual experience with the Jesus Prayer as a proof that "The name of God is God Himself and can produce miracles". The book became extremely popular among the Russian monks on Mount Athos (then in the Ottoman Empire, now in Greece). Many of them argued that since, according to Plato and the Stoics, names and forms pre-exist prior to becoming “sensual manifestations in the world", so the name of God must have existed prior to creation, and that the Holy Name cannot be anything but God Himself. Among other things, this was thought to mean that knowledge of the secret name of God alone allows one to perform miracles (a similar concept exists in Kabbalah).

Persecution on Mount Athos

Both Elder Hilarion’s book on Hesychasm and Fr. Anthony Alexander Bulatovich’s book defending Name-Glorification drew many monks of Mount Athos into the controversy. Ecumenical Patriarchs Joachim III of Constantinople and Germanus V of Constantinople and the Holy Synod of the Russian Orthodox Church issued condemnations of Name-Glorification as being pantheistic, but without ever interviewing its supporters. Name-Glorifiers on Mount Athos were denied mail, money transfers, as well as the Mysteries. On June 17, 1913 the Imperial Russian Navy steamship Tsar arrived at Mount Athos with Archbishop Nikon, Professor Triotsky, 118 soldiers and 5 officers to enforce the ruling of the Holy Synod. That same day, the Protos, the monastic office of the Eastern Orthodox monastic state of Mount Athos, announced that if the "heretics" were not removed from the area, then all of the Russians would be expelled by the Greeks.

On July 16, 1913, the Kherson arrived and the Russian soldiers began arresting unarmed Name-Glorifiers. Shebunin, the Russian consul in Constantinople, ordered the 6th Company of the 50th Białystok Regiment to take them by storm, but without bloodshed. These soldiers were made drunk for this purpose by Archimandrite Misail, head of St. Panteleimon Monastery, resulting in bloodshed. The Kherson doctor’s registry lists 46 monks from St. Panteleimon were injured and allegedly four killed. This occurred on the feast day of the miraculous icon of the Mother of God Galaktotrophousa (“Milk-Giver”), enshrined at Hilandar Monastery of the Serbians. More Name-Glorifiers at the Skete of Saint Andrew were arrested on July 19 without confrontation.

The steamer with the captured monks stood near Athos until July 22. 40 of the injured were sent to the Mount Athos hospital and the remaining 621 monks (418 from St. Panteleimon’s and 183 from St. Andrew’s) were shipped to Odessa. Upon arrival, customs agents seized all of their possessions which were never returned. After interrogation in Odessa, 8 monks were deported back to St. Andrew’s, 40 jailed, and the rest had their hair and beards shaved, were defrocked, and resettled in the cities of their homeland. Those who were priests were forbidden to hold liturgies, while many were denied the sacraments for the rest of their lives, and at death were deprived the last rites and a Christian burial. On July 17, 1923 another 212 monks who opted to voluntarily leave Mount Athos arrived in Odessa on the steamer Chikhachev, some wearing Jewish kippot as ritual mockery. The population of Russian monks on Mount Athos, recorded as being 3,496 in 1910, shrank to 1,914 in 1914.

Proponents and opponents

The main proponent of the Imiaslavie doctrine was Anthony Bulatovich, a Hieromonk of St. Andrew’s who published books on the subject. Those who promote this doctrine claim support from the writings of Saint John of Kronstadt, and the influential mystic and healer Grigori Rasputin, the popularly styled "mad monk" closely associated with the Russian Imperial Family shortly before the October Revolution. Saint John of Kronstadt died before this controversy erupted, and his quotes, it can be argued, were taken out of context to support a whole set of ideas that were not found in his own writings. One of the most precise definitions of the Imiaslavie position comes from its advocate Aleksei Losev who writes that Imiaslavie is to be understood as “mystical formula”: “the exact mystical formula of Imiaslavie will sound like this: a) the name of God is energy of God, inseparable from the essence of God itself, and therefore is God himself. b) However, God is distinct from His energies and from His name, and that is why God is not His name or a name in general”

Aftermath
On 27 August 1914, Bulatovich asked to be sent as an Army chaplain to World War I, and this request was granted by the Holy Synod. He sent two letters to Tsar Nicholas II between 1914-16. In his 1914 letter, he warned: The procrastination and actions of the Synod "push" Russia into disasters: "What further disasters this will lead Russia to, only God knows this”. 

On 1 July 1915, the Holy Synod received a letter from the original author, starets and schema-monk Hilarion, asking whether he was expelled from the Church; Hilarion lived as a hermit in the Caucasus Mountains and seems to have been unaware of the controversy and unrest his book caused. Hilarion stated in July 1915 that the persecution coming from “the highest members of the Russian hierarchy, is a sure omen of the proximity of times in which the last enemy of truth, the all-pernicious Antichrist, has to come.” Hilarion died on 2 June 1916, without having received an answer.

In September 1917, the Pomestny Sobor of the Russian Orthodox Church was convened to solve the Imiaslavie question, with both strong proponents and opponents present. The work of the Sobor was aborted due to the October Revolution. Among the theologians who advocated for Imiaslavie were Pavel Florensky and Sergey Bulgakov. Bulatovich’s second letter to the Tsar in 1916 noted that he “correlates the military failures of Russia in World War 1 at the front with the struggle of the Synod against Name-Glorification”.

Bishop Hilarion (Alfeyev) wrote in 1999 that: “Even though the movement of the 'Name-worshippers' was crushed at the beginning of the century on the orders of the Holy Synod, discussion of the matter regained impetus in the years preceding the Moscow Council (1917–18), which was supposed to come to a decision about this but did not succeed in doing so. Thus the Church's final assessment of Name-worshipping remains an open question to this day.”

Imiaslavie and mathematics
The Russian Mathematics School is considered by some to have been created by Dmitri Egorov and Nikolai Luzin, both of whom were imiaslavians and personal friends of Pavel Florensky as well as philosopher Aleksei Losev (both imiaslavians in theology).

Analysis 
Social Psychology Prof. Martin Bauer frames this as a conflict over "representation" which "centres on the issue of whether a word is more than just a flatus voci (Latin for a vocal fart)."

See also
 Sergei Bulgakov
 Pavel Florensky
 Hesychasm
 Holy Name of Jesus
 Jesus Prayer
 Logos

Notes

References

Further reading
 Bishop Hilarion Alfeyev, Le Nom grand et glorieux. La vénération du Nom de Dieu et la prière de Jésus dans la tradition orthodoxe. Paris: Cerf, 2007.
 Bishop Hilarion Alfeyev, Le mystère sacré de l'Eglise. L'introduction à l'histoire et à la problématique des débats athonites sur la vénération du Nom de Dieu. Fribourg: Academic Press, 2007.
 Daniel Colucciello Barber, Deleuze and the Naming of God (2015), Edinburgh University Press
 Robert Bird, Ph.D., "Imiaslavie and Baroque Spirituality." AAASS Convention, Pittsburgh, PA, 22 November 2002
 Sergius Bulgakov (author), Boris Jakim (translator), Icons and the Name of God (2012), Eerdmans
 Sergius Bulgakov, Философия имени [Philosophy of the Name], 1920)
 Dr. John Eugene Clay, Arizona State University, "Popular Uses of the Jesus Prayer in Imperial Russia from the Old Believers to the Name-Glorifiers", presentation at AAR, Philadelphia, Pennsylvania, November 2005
 Tom E. Dykstra, Hallowed Be Thy Name: The Name-Glorifying Dispute in the Russian Orthodox Church and on Mt. Athos, 1912-1914 , 2014. 
 Nicholas Fenne, Russian Monks on Mount Athos: The Thousand Year History of St Panteleimon's; Holy Trinity Seminary Press (September 28, 2021)
 Helena Gourko, Divine Onomatology: Naming God in Imyaslavie, Symbolism, and Deconstruction (2005), Ph.D. dissertation at Boston University
 Loren Graham, Jean-Michel Kantor, Naming Infinity:  A True Story of Religious Mysticism and Mathematical Creativity, Harvard University Press, 2009
 Valentina Izmirlieva, All the Names of the Lord: Lists, Mysticism, and Magic (2008), University of Chicago Press
 Scott M. Kenworthy, Ph.D., "Church, State, and Society in Late-Imperial Russia: The Imiaslavie Controversy," presentation at American Association for the Advancement of Slavic Studies National Convention, Pittsburgh, Pennsylvania, November 2002
 Scott M. Kenworthy, Ph.D., "Church, State, and Society in Late-Imperial Russia: Nikon (Rozhdestvenskii) and Imiaslavie," presentation at Midwest Russian Historians Workshop, Miami University, Oxford, Ohio, March 2003

 Michael T. Miller, The Name of God in Jewish Thought: A Philosophical Analysis of Mystical Traditions from Apocalyptic to Kabbalah (2015), Routledge

External links
 Met. Alfeyev, The Sacred Mystery of the Church
 Pavel Florensky, Brief biography of Starets Illarion and History of Imiaslavie in Russia
 Alexei Losev Imiaslavie
 Alexei Losev, Philosophy of a Name
 Metropolitan Veniamin (Fedchenko), Imiaslavie
Martin W. Bauer, “On (social) representations and the iconoclastic impetus”, in The Cambridge Handbook of Social Representations; Edited by Gordon Sammut, Eleni Andreouli, Milton Keynes, George Gaskell, Jaan Valsiner; Cambridge University Press: Cambridge, MA (2015)
Nel Grillaert, “What’s in God’s Name: literary forerunners and philosophical allies of the imjaslavie debate” (Ghent University: 2012)
Clarification of Bishop Gregory of Petrograd and Gdov Concerning the Barlaamite Heresy of Bishop Photios of Marathon
 G.M. Hamburg, “The Origins of 'Heresy' on Mount Athos: Ilarion's Na Gorakh Kavkaza (1907)”
Scott M. Kenworthy, "Archbishop Nikon (Rozhdestvenskii) and Pavel Florenskii on Spiritual Experience, Theology, and the Name-Glorifiers Dispute"
Scott M. Kenworthy, "Debating the Theology of the Name in Post-Soviet Russia: Metropolitan Ilarion Alfeev and Sergei Khoruzhii"
Anthony Khrapovitsky, “On The New False Teaching, The Deifying Name”
 Archbishop Nikon (Rozhdestvenskii), "The Crafty designs of the enemy will destroy...": Diaries: 1910-1917 - by active disputant in the controversy with the Imiabozhie
Paul Ladouceur, “The Name of God Conflict in Orthodox Theology," St. Vladimir's Theological Quarterly, 56, 4 (2012), 415-436.
K. Senina The status of divine revelation in the works of Hieromonk Anthony Bulatovich
Nun Kassia (Senina) Theological Discussion About the Name of God: Historical and Contemporary
[http://www.regels.org/Divine-Name-Controversy.htm Tatiana Senina '’The Divine Name Controversy]
Tatiana Sénina, Un palamite russe du début du XXème siècle : le hiéromoine Antoine Boulatovitch et sa doctrine sur l’énergie divine", in Scrinium, t. 6: Patrologia Pacifica Secunda'' (2010) 392-409.
Teresa Obolevitch, “Christian Philosophy and the Name of God: Aesthetics as a Way of Life according to Alexei Losev”; The Journal of Eastern Christian Studies 71/1-2 (2019), p. 93-106
 Of imyaslavtsy or imyabozhniki: Dispute about nature of the name of God and Athos - Extensive discussion
In the Name of God:100 Years of the Imiaslavie Movement in the Church of Russia
Monk Hilarion On the Mountains of the Caucasus
Matthew Raphael Johnson, “‘Name Worship,’ Epistemology and the Abuse of Christian Philosophy: A Revision”
ONOMATOLATRIA: The Church decisions that condemned Name-Worshipping
Daniel Paul Payne, The Revival of Political Hesychasm in Contemporary Orthodox Thought, Lexington Books: 2011
Loren Graham lectures on his book Naming God, Naming Infinity: Religious Mysticism and Mathematical Creativity

Eastern Orthodox belief and doctrine
Heresy in Christianity
Language and mysticism
Conceptions of God